Henri Georges Boulay de la Meurthe, 2nd Count Boulay de La Meurthe (15 July 1797 – 24 November 1858) was a French politician who served as vice president of France from 1849 to 1852, and is the only person to ever have that title.

Biography 
He was born in Nancy, France in 1797.

A staunch Republican and Bonapartist, he was elected to the Provisional Assembly in 1848, and was elected Vice President on 20 January 1849. He served until 14 January 1852, upon which the post, and the Second Republic itself, were abolished. He served in the Senate from 26 January 1852 until his death on 24 November 1858.

He died in Paris, France on 24 November 1858 at the age of 61.

References

External links
 
 Pour la famille Boulay (de la Meurthe) : voir la revue Généalogie Lorraine 128, revue de l'Union des Cercles Généalogiques Lorrains (UCGL), ainsi que l'article en ligne.

1797 births
1858 deaths
Vice presidents
Politicians from Nancy, France